The eastern shew mouse (Pseudohydromys murinus) is a species of rodent in the family Muridae. It is found only in Papua New Guinea.

References

Pseudohydromys
Rodents of Papua New Guinea
Mammals described in 1934
Taxonomy articles created by Polbot
Rodents of New Guinea